"Who?" (1925) is a popular song (sometimes written as "Who (Stole My Heart Away)?") written for the Broadway musical Sunny by Jerome Kern, Otto Harbach and Oscar Hammerstein II. The song was also featured in the film version of Sunny (1930) starring Marilyn Miller.

George Olsen and His Orchestra scored a major hit with their 1925 recording of the song. Tommy Dorsey and His Orchestra with vocalist Jack Leonard had a hit with it in the late 1930s; their arrangement was patterned after Dorsey's 1937 recording of "Marie". Judy Garland sang the song in the Metro-Goldwyn-Mayer biopic Till the Clouds Roll By (1946), loosely based on the life of Jerome Kern.

Notable recording artists

 Pearl Bailey
 Josephine Baker
 Sidney Bechet
 Jack Buchanan
 The Tommy Dorsey Orchestra
 Roy Fox and His Orchestra
 Benny Goodman (both Goodman's Orchestra and Trio)
 Judy Garland
 Erroll Garner
 Carroll Gibbons and the Boyfriends
 Jean Goldkette & His Orchestra
 Binnie Hale
 Ace Harris
 The Ipana Troubadours
 Sammy Kaye
 Kurt Hohenberger
 Jerome Kern
 Gene Krupa and His Orchestra
 Guy Lombardo and His Royal Canadians
 Hal Mooney
 Red Nichols and The Five Pennies 
 George Olsen and His Orchestra
 André Previn
 Eric Rogers and His Orchestra
 Raymond Scott Quintette
 The Ralph Sharon Trio
 Dinah Shore
 Frank Sinatra
 Paul Weston and His Orchestra
 Also on The Muppet Show 2 album as sung by Zelda Rose and Her Singing Owl (the latter singing only the "Who" part)

External links
 "Who?" at Jazz Standards

1925 songs
1926 singles
Songs from musicals
Songs with music by Jerome Kern
Songs with lyrics by Otto Harbach
Songs with lyrics by Oscar Hammerstein II
Number-one singles in the United States